The diwan of Mysore, also spelled dewan of Mysore, was the de facto chief executive officer of the Government of Mysore (now Government of Karnataka) and the prime minister and royal adviser to the maharaja of Mysore and thus, ex officio, chairman of the Dewan's Council (now Cabinet). The role evolved in name and responsibilities since the foundation of the fiefdom of Mysore in 1350 and its proper reformation into a kingdom in the following centuries until the kingdom's full abolishment in 1950. With the constitution of India into a republic in 1950, the position was replaced by Chief Minister of Mysore (later renamed Chief Minister of Karnataka).

From offering minor political advice to the monarch as amatya (Sanskrit for minister) like in the Vijayanagara Empire to later acting as a major military chieftain as dalvoy (Kannada for military chief) like in other southern kingdoms to being the head of the government as diwan (Persian/Urdu for accountant or chief adviser) like in the Ottoman Empire, the role has transmuted in powers over time.

From being handpicked by the monarch to being elected through popular suffrage, the mode of appointment and appointer also changed.

Formation and abolishment

Dalvoy 
Until the mid-18th century, the role of the monarch's adviser was known as dalvoy, also spelled as dalavay or dalvi, under the Wadiyars. The word dalvoy is a vernacular form of the Sanskrit word dalapati (commander-in-chief).

Owing to the deposition of Maharaja Krishnaraja Wadiyar II by his own dalvoy Hyder Ali and his assumption as the supreme leader in 1761, until after Ali's son Tipu was briefly in that position, the role of dalvoy became abandoned.

Diwan 
After Ali's death in 1782, Tipu assumed power as the Sultan of Mysore who first constituted the role of Diwan of Mysore when he made his longtime childhood friend K. Purnaiah his adviser and labelled him his diwan. Under him, the maharaja was de-recognised and the role of diwan was gradually formally codified into government. The role in its form became so popular under Tipu that later on, other Indian kingdoms incorporated the role and the title into their governments, such as Diwan of Kashmir, Travancore, Hyderabad, Baroda, Indore, etc.

In 1799, Tipu was executed, and British India installed Krishnaraja Wadiyar III as the maharaja. The Wadiyars continued appointing to the role of diwan after resumption of power, starting with Purnaiah himself being continued. Under the maharajas, it became one of the most venerable, esteemed, and celebrated leadership roles in princely India.

Chief minister 
In 1950, after the accession of the Kingdom of Mysore into the Republic of India, all titles and positions ascribed to the kingdom were abolished, including that of the diwan. It was replaced by Chief Minister of Mysore State, now renamed Chief Minister of Karnataka.

The role as diwan remained active in Mysore through one sultan and four maharajas. There have been a total of 24 diwans and two acting diwans. Most diwans during the latter years were civil servants in the Indian Imperial Service or Mysore Police Service.

Diwans 

The first Diwan of Mysore was K. Purnaiah selected by Tipu, who served almost three decades from 1782 to 1811 and two rulers. The last diwan was Sir A. R. Mudaliar under Maharaja Jayachamaraja Wadiyar, who served from 1946 to 1949. Other popular diwans of Mysore include Sir C. V. Rungacharlu, Sir K. Seshadri Iyer, Sir M. Visvesvaraya, Sir M. Kantharaj Urs, and Sir Mirza Ismail.Many of the diwans are associated with several industrial, financial, public infrastructure, and educational initiatives undertaken during their terms. These initiatives include almost all works assigned by the king or undertaken by the diwans themselves. This includes activities like setting up and maintaining industries like dams for irrigation like hydroelectric power plants on the Shivanasamudra Falls and the Jog Falls in 1902, Visvesvaraya Iron and Steel Plant in 1923, Krishna Raja Sagara in 1924, Hindustan Aeronautics Limited in 1940, Mysore Lamps, Mysore Chemical and Fertilisers Factory, Mysore Paper Mills, Mysore Paints and Varnish Limited,  among others. Bangalore was the first city in India to get electric streetlights in 1905 under Sir P. N. Krishnamurti. The State Bank of Mysore was established in 1913 at M. Visvesvaraya's initiative.

See also 

 List of diwans of Mysore
 Chief Minister of Karnataka
 List of Chief Ministers of Karnataka
 List of diwans of Travancore
 List of diwans of Hyderabad

References 

Kingdom of Mysore
People of the Kingdom of Mysore
Diwans of Mysore
Mysore
Karnataka